For other persons with this name, please see Kamanawa II.

Kamanawa (died c. 1802?) was a Hawaiian high chief and early supporter of King Kamehameha I, known as one of the royal Nīʻaupiʻo twins with his brother Kameeiamoku. He later became the stepfather of Kamehameha by marrying his mother.

Life
Kamanawa's father was Keawepoepoe. His mother was Kanoena, sister of his father.
His namesake grandnephew Kamanawa II (grandson of his twin) was grandfather of the last two ruling monarchs of the Kingdom.
The name ka manawa (sometimes spelled "Ka-manawa") means "the season" in the Hawaiian language.

His first wife was named the High Chiefess Kekelaokalani of Maui, the daughter of his aunt, Queen Kekuiapoiwanui of Maui, by her second marriage to High Chief Kauakahiakua-o-Lono of Maui. His second wife was Chiefess Kekuiapoiwa II, the mother of Kamehameha I.
He had three sons: Koahou, Noukana, and Amamalua from his first wife.
He also has a daughter Peleuli, who became a consort of King Kamehameha, by his first wife and a daughter Piʻipiʻi Kalanikaulihiwakama by his second wife.

Since his double grandmother Kalanikauleleiaiwi was Kamehameha's great-grandmother, they were half-cousins once removed by blood. However, he was also father-in-law and stepfather to Kamehameha, so was called his uncle.

He probably died around 1802.

Ancestry

References

External links
Imaginary Portrait of Kameʻeiamoku and Kamanawa

Royalty of the Hawaiian Kingdom
Hawaii (island)
Hawaiian Kingdom politicians
Hawaiian Kingdom twins
18th-century births
1800s deaths
Year of birth unknown
Year of death uncertain